Tom Strohbach (born 27 May 1992) is a former German male volleyball player. He was part of the Germany men's national volleyball team winning the gold medal at the 2015 European Games in Baku. On club level he played for Generali Unterhaching.

References

External links
 Tom Tino Strohbach at FIVB
 
 

1992 births
Living people
German men's volleyball players
Place of birth missing (living people)
Volleyball players at the 2015 European Games
European Games gold medalists for Germany
European Games medalists in volleyball
21st-century German people